The Salaam Somali Bank (SSB) is a bank headquartered in Mogadishu, Somalia.

Overview
Salaam Somali Bank was established in October 2009. It is the first international bank to operate in Somalia since 1991.

Salaam Somali Bank herein SSB, is an Islamic bank which targets both consumers and businesses BtoC/BtoB, the bank offers personal banking, commercial banking, and non-profit banking. Its Islamic banking services and facilities include Mudharabah, Murabahah and Musharakah. Additionally, the bank offers online banking, mobile banking and debit cards.
 
SSB established new branches in The last 3years. the bank expanded well when to compare 2012. in 2014, the institution also began providing automatic teller machine (ATM) services at a location in Mogadishu. The devices operate in English, and were at their launch billed as the first of their kind in Somalia. However, the separate Salaam Bank institution headquartered in Bosaso already provided ATM services for several years prior.

Services
Salaam Somali Bank's personal banking services include current accounts (personal and salary), as well as savings accounts (Dalmar savings accounts for the diaspora, Hajj-Umra account, and students savings account).

The institution's commercial banking services include business current accounts, Bank Guarantees and Letters of Credit.

Its non-profit banking services include a Trust Account for non-governmental organizations, associations, societies and trusts.

The bank also launched a microfinance product (Kalkaal) for small businesses and professionals. Additionally, it offers anti-money laundering protection.

See also

First Somali Bank

Notes

Banks of Somalia
Companies based in Mogadishu
2009 establishments in Somalia
Banks established in 2009